Sexual and Reproductive Health Matters (SRHM), formerly Reproductive Health Matters (RHM), is an organisation that promotes sexual and reproductive health and rights (SRHR) globally. SRHM's mission is to advance the creation and dissemination of sexual and reproductive health knowledge that is grounded in human rights and based on credible evidence, and to facilitate the transformation of such knowledge into action for improved SRHR. This mission is shaped by the understanding that rights- and evidence-based knowledge is power.

SRHM is the only global organisation linked to a scientific, highly reputed journal in the field of sexual and reproductive health that provides an independent voice, has a long-time, trusted reputation, and offers space to a truly global network of researchers, policy makers, programme managers, lawyers and activists in the field of sexual and reproductive health. 

The SRHM journal, established in 1993, is an open-access, peer-reviewed academic journal. Founding director and editor Marge Berer, led RHM (in 2019, Reproductive Health Matters changed its name to Sexual and Reproductive Health Matters) since its inception until 2015 when she handed over responsibilities to Shirin Heidari. In 2018, Shirin handed over her responsibilities to Dr. Julia Hussein as editor-in-chief and Eszter Kismodi as chief executive. In 2020, after Julia announced her retirement, Dr. Emma Pitchforth took over the role of executive editor.

Abstracting and indexing 
The journal is abstracted and indexed in:

The journal has a 2021 impact factor of 5.732.

References

External links 
 
Journal website

Sexual health
Public health journals
Biannual journals
Taylor & Francis academic journals
Multilingual journals
Publications established in 1993
Reproductive health journals
Open access journals